Phricanthes chalcentes is a species of moth of the family Tortricidae. It is found on Peninsular Malaysia.

References

Moths described in 1983
Phricanthini